Anthony Martin Tew (24 August 1908 – 23 June 1987) was an English first-class cricketer and police officer.

The son of E. W. Tew and his wife,  Catherine Isabel Hawke (sister of Lord Hawke), he was born in August 1908 at Wigginton, Yorkshire. He was educated at Winchester College, before going up to Magdalen College, Oxford. While studying at Oxford, he made two appearances in first-class cricket for Oxford University in 1928, against Kent and the touring West Indians at Oxford. He scored 5 runs in his two matches, in addition to taking 3 wickets.

After graduating from Oxford, he became a police officer. He served with Lincolnshire Constabulary, rising to the rank of inspector by 1946. He was appointed as chief constable of Shropshire Constabulary on 5 February 1946, however he resigned from the post just one day later for personal reasons and was succeeded by Douglas Osmond.

Personal life
He married Suffolk artist Beryl Alice Matchwick in 1948. He continued to serve in the police, reaching the rank of superintendent for the Cleethorpes Division of Lincolnshire Constabulary. In his later years, he lived with his wife at Ramsbury near Marlborough. Tew died in June 1987, aged 78, at the Princess Margaret Hospital, Swindon. His brother, John, also played first-class cricket.

References

External links

1908 births
1987 deaths
People from York
People educated at Winchester College
Alumni of Magdalen College, Oxford
English cricketers
Oxford University cricketers
British police officers
British Chief Constables